La Semaine de Suzette was a French magazine aimed at girls, which appeared from 1905 until 1960. It contained early comics like Bécassine.

History
La Semaine de Suzette (Suzette's Week) started in 1905 as a magazine aimed at conservative, Catholic French girls, published by Gautier & Languereau. The founder was Henri Gautier. It contained stories and comics, but also patterns for doll clothes, e.g. for the magazine's mascot Bleuette. Readers were mainly Catholic middle-class girls aged between 8 and 18.

La Semaine de Suzette was published weekly on Thursdays. The first issue appeared on 2 February 1905, and the last on 25 August 1960, with a break during World War II from 6 June 1940 until 30 May 1946.

Many of the text stories which appeared in La Semaine de Suzette were later republished in the Bibliothèque de Suzette (Suzette's Library), which existed between 1919 and 1965.

References

External links 
 Ilustrators of La Semaine de Suzette

1905 establishments in France
1960 disestablishments in France
1905 comics debuts
1960 comics endings
Defunct magazines published in France
Comics magazines published in France
French-language magazines
Magazines established in 1905
Magazines disestablished in 1960
Youth magazines
Weekly magazines published in France
Magazines about comics